The vidane or vithanai was an influential post in the Native Headman System in Ceylon (Sri Lanka) during the colonial era. Appointed by the Government Aagent of the Province. The holder had much control over the people of the area and wielded quasi-judicial powers since he was responsible to keep the peace, carry out revenue collection and assist in judicial functions.

Appointments were non-transferable and usually hereditary, made to locals, usually from wealthy influential families loyal to the British Crown

History

Origins
The post was in existence before the Colonial Rule of Sri Lanka (Ceylon). After the coastal areas were taken over by the Colonial Rulers i.e. Portuguese, Dutch colonial rule and finally the British, they retained the post in their administration system.

British period
During the British administration, appointments were made by the Government Agent of the Province. Appointments were non-transferable and usually hereditary, made to locals, usually from wealthy influential families loyal the British Crown. This was an influential post, the holder had much control over the people of the area and had limited police powers since he was responsible to keep the peace, carry out revenue collection and assist in judicial functions. This became part of the Native Department of the British Government of Ceylon.

Several Vidanes (විදානෙ) came under the supervision of a Vidane Arachchi (විදානෙ ආරච්චි) in Low Country and under the supervision of Udayar in Tamil Area.

Reforms and abolition
Following the formation of the State Council of Ceylon in 1931, one of its members, H. W. Amarasuriya, called for an inquiry into the Native Headman System. A commission was formed made up of retired civil servants and lawyers headed by H.M. Wedderburn. The commission reported on reforming the headman system or replacing it with transferable District Revenue Officers. The Native Headman System was abolished as an administrative system, with the titles of Mudaliyar (Mudali - මුදලි) and Muhandiram retained by government to be awarded as honors. This practice remained until suspension of Celanese honors in 1956. The minor headman positions were retained, surviving well into the 1970s when the posts of Vidane (විදානෙ) in Low Country / Tamil Area and Town Arachchi (ටවුන් ආරච්චි) / Gan Arachchi (ගන් ආරච්චි) in Kandyan Area were replaced with the transferable post of Grama Niladhari (Village Officer).

Types of the British Vidanes
 Vidane -  a village or a group of small villages placed under his administration. Vidane was a Low Country headman ranking immediately below that of a Vidane Arachchi in Low Country and below that of a Udayar in Tamil Area in the Native Headmen System. A Vidane was equivalent in ranking to the Kandyan Areas headmen Town Arachchi or a Gan Arachchi
 Police vidane - in charge of police duties in the Village under the supervision of the vidane
W.P Sodina was the police vidane in Kirindiwela, Gampaha District, Western Province

 Vel vidane -  in charge of distributing water from the wewa (tank) to villagers for cultivation under the supervision of the vidane
 Seeni Viande - in charge of distributing Sugar under the supervision of the vidane

See also
Native headmen of Ceylon
Arachchi
Grama Niladhari
Walauwa

References

External links
 Twentieth Century Impressions of Ceylon 
 A vignette of British Justice in Colonial Ceylon
 The Mudaliyars Explained 
 Our Man in Cochin

British Ceylon
Defunct government positions in Sri Lanka
Defunct government positions
Defunct law enforcement agencies of Sri Lanka
Transitional period of Sri Lanka
Kandyan period
British Ceylon period
Sri Lankan police officers